The following is a list of municipalities (/) of the autonomous province of South Tyrol, Italy. South Tyrol is divided into 116 administrative subdivisions. Both German and Italian are official languages in this province. Some municipalities have a third official language, Ladin. The capital of the province is in bold.

See also 
 List of municipalities of Italy
 Prontuario dei nomi locali dell'Alto Adige
 Municipalities of Trentino